Berkswell windmill is a four bladed tower mill constructed in 1826 on the site of a former post mill, in the village of Balsall Common, in the parish of Berkswell, in the Metropolitan Borough of Solihull, West Midlands. The windmill is built in  brick with a wooden boat shaped cap, and is turned into the wind by an endless chain winding mechanism. It was historically used to grind flour and animal feeds, and in 1927 the milling wheels were adapted to run via a diesel engine, not reliant upon the variable nature of the wind. The mill was finally closed in 1948, after the last miller John Hammond died.

The windmill is a grade II Star  listed building and a scheduled monument. It is in private ownership. It is currently closed as it is undergoing extensive repairs and maintenance.( REF:  Friends of the Berkswell Windmill). It was formerly restored between 1973 and 1975, by the Millwright Derek Ogden, for its then owners George and Betty Field, and was complete, with sails and all internal machinery and tools for making flour and animal feed. However, after the death of the owner the windmill again fell into some disrepair until purchased by the current owner in 2006.  It is currently undergoing further extensive restoration work.

The refurbishment work includes work to the perimeter wall, tower, cap and new sails. (ref: Friends of the Berkswell Windmill)

References

Friends of the Berkswell Windmill: owner

Windmills in the West Midlands (county)
Buildings and structures in Solihull
Tower mills in the United Kingdom
Grade II* listed windmills
Grade II listed buildings in the West Midlands (county)
Windmills completed in 1826
1826 establishments in England
Towers completed in 1826